The fourteenth edition of the Johan Cruyff Shield was held on 25 July 2009 at the Amsterdam Arena. The match featured the 2008–09 Eredivisie champions AZ and 2008–09 KNVB Cup winners SC Heerenveen. The match inaugurated the 2009–10 season in Dutch football.

Match details

 

2009
Joh
J
J
Johan Cruyff Shield